The 2022 Aberto Santa Catarina de Tenis was a professional tennis tournament played on clay courts. It was the eighth edition of the tournament which was part of the 2022 ATP Challenger Tour. It took place in Blumenau, Brazil between 10 and 16 January 2022.

Singles main draw entrants

Seeds

 1 Rankings as of 3 January 2022.

Other entrants
The following players received wildcards into the singles main draw:
  Pedro Boscardin Dias
  Matheus Amorim de Lima
  João Victor Couto Loureiro

The following players received entry into the singles main draw as alternates:
  Mateus Alves
  Strong Kirchheimer
  João Lucas Reis da Silva

The following players received entry from the qualifying draw:
  Román Andrés Burruchaga
  Ignacio Carou
  Quentin Folliot
  Tomás Lipovšek Puches
  José Pereira
  Eduardo Ribeiro

Champions

Singles

 Igor Marcondes def.  Juan Bautista Torres 3–6, 7–5, 6–1.

Doubles

 Boris Arias /  Federico Zeballos def.  Diego Hidalgo /  Cristian Rodríguez 7–6(7–3), 6–1.

References

Aberto Santa Catarina de Tenis
2022 in Brazilian sport
January 2022 sports events in Brazil